Union High School is a public high school in Union, Oregon, United States.

Academics
In 2008, 97% of the school's seniors received their high school diploma. Of 36 students, 35 graduated, none dropped out, and one was still in high school the following year.

References

External links
 Union School District website

High schools in Union County, Oregon
Public high schools in Oregon